Ardbeg is a small settlement on the island of Bute in Scotland, in Argyll and Bute. It is on the south side of Port Bannatyne. It developed largely in the 19th century as part of Rothesay's tourist boom.

References

Isle of Bute
Geography of Argyll and Bute